Radio propagation is the behavior of radio waves as they travel, or are propagated, from one point to another in vacuum, or into various parts of the atmosphere. As a form of electromagnetic radiation, like light waves, radio waves are affected by the phenomena of reflection, refraction, diffraction, absorption, polarization, and scattering. Understanding the effects of varying conditions on radio propagation has many practical applications, from choosing frequencies for amateur radio communications, international shortwave broadcasters, to designing reliable mobile telephone systems, to radio navigation, to operation of radar systems.

Several different types of propagation are used in practical radio transmission systems. Line-of-sight propagation means radio waves which travel in a straight line from the transmitting antenna to the receiving antenna. Line of sight transmission is used for medium-distance radio transmission, such as cell phones, cordless phones, walkie-talkies, wireless networks, FM radio, television broadcasting, radar, and satellite communication (such as satellite television). Line-of-sight transmission on the surface of the Earth is limited to the distance to the visual horizon, which depends on the height of transmitting and receiving antennas. It is the only propagation method possible at microwave frequencies and above.

At lower frequencies in the MF, LF, and VLF bands, diffraction allows radio waves to bend over hills and other obstacles, and travel beyond the horizon, following the contour of the Earth. These are called surface waves or ground wave propagation. AM broadcast and amateur radio stations use ground waves to cover their listening areas. As the frequency gets lower, the attenuation with distance decreases, so very low frequency (VLF) to extremely low frequency (ELF) ground waves can be used to communicate worldwide. VLF to ELF waves can penetrate significant distances through water and earth, and these frequencies are used for mine communication and military communication with submerged submarines.

At medium wave and shortwave frequencies (MF and HF bands) radio waves can refract from the ionosphere. This means that medium and short radio waves transmitted at an angle into the sky can be refracted back to Earth at great distances beyond the horizon – even transcontinental distances. This is called skywave propagation. It is used by amateur radio operators to communicate with operators in distant countries, and by shortwave broadcast stations to transmit internationally.

In addition, there are several less common radio propagation mechanisms, such as tropospheric scattering (troposcatter), tropospheric ducting (ducting) at VHF frequencies and near vertical incidence skywave (NVIS) which are used when HF communications are desired within a few hundred miles.

Frequency dependence
At different frequencies, radio waves travel through the atmosphere by different mechanisms or modes:

Free space propagation

In free space, all electromagnetic waves (radio, light, X-rays, etc.) obey the inverse-square law which states that the power density  of an electromagnetic wave is proportional to the inverse of the square of the distance  from a point source or:

At typical communication distances from a transmitter, the transmitting antenna usually can be approximated by a point source. Doubling the distance of a receiver from a transmitter means that the power density of the radiated wave at that new location is reduced to one-quarter of its previous value.

The power density per surface unit is proportional to the product of the electric and magnetic field strengths. Thus, doubling the propagation path distance from the transmitter reduces each of these received field strengths over a free-space path by one-half.

Radio waves in vacuum travel at the speed of light. The Earth's atmosphere is thin enough that radio waves in the atmosphere travel very close to the speed of light, but variations in density and temperature can cause some slight refraction (bending) of waves over distances.

Direct modes (line-of-sight)
Line-of-sight refers to radio waves which travel directly in a line from the transmitting antenna to the receiving antenna. It does not necessarily require a cleared sight path; at lower frequencies radio waves can pass through buildings, foliage and other obstructions. This is the most common propagation mode at VHF and above, and the only possible mode at microwave frequencies and above. This is the method used by cell phones, cordless phones, walkie-talkies, wireless networks, point-to-point microwave radio relay links, FM and television broadcasting and radar.

Ground plane reflection effects are an important factor in VHF line-of-sight propagation. The interference between the direct beam line-of-sight and the ground reflected beam often leads to an effective inverse-fourth-power  law for ground-plane limited radiation.

Surface modes (groundwave)

Lower frequency (between 30 and 3,000 kHz) vertically polarized radio waves can travel as surface waves following the contour of the Earth; this is called ground wave propagation. 

In this mode the radio wave propagates by interacting with the conductive surface of the Earth. The wave "clings" to the surface and thus follows the curvature of the Earth, so ground waves can travel over mountains and beyond the horizon. Ground waves propagate in vertical polarization so vertical antennas (monopoles) are required. Since the ground is not a perfect electrical conductor, ground waves are attenuated as they follow the Earth's surface. Attenuation is proportional to frequency, so ground waves are the main mode of propagation at lower frequencies, in the MF, LF and VLF bands. Ground waves are used by radio broadcasting stations in the MF and LF bands, and for time signals and radio navigation systems.

At even lower frequencies, in the VLF to ELF bands, an Earth-ionosphere waveguide mechanism allows even longer range transmission. These frequencies are used for secure military communications. They can also penetrate to a significant depth into seawater, and so are used for one-way military communication to submerged submarines.

Early long-distance radio communication (wireless telegraphy) before the mid-1920s used low frequencies in the longwave bands and relied exclusively on ground-wave propagation. Frequencies above 3 MHz were regarded as useless and were given to hobbyists (radio amateurs). The discovery around 1920 of the ionospheric reflection or skywave mechanism made the medium wave and short wave frequencies useful for long-distance communication and they were allocated to commercial and military users.

Non-line-of-sight modes

Measuring HF propagation
HF propagation conditions can be simulated using radio propagation models, such as the Voice of America Coverage Analysis Program, and realtime measurements can be done using chirp transmitters. For radio amateurs the WSPR mode provides maps with real time propagation conditions between a network of transmitters and receivers. Even without special beacons the realtime propagation conditions can be measured: A worldwide network of receivers decodes morse code signals on amateur radio frequencies in realtime and provides sophisticated search functions and propagation maps for every station received.

Practical effects
The average person can notice the effects of changes in radio propagation in several ways.

In AM broadcasting, the dramatic ionospheric changes that occur overnight in the mediumwave band drive a unique broadcast license scheme in the United States, with entirely different transmitter power output levels and directional antenna patterns to cope with skywave propagation at night. Very few stations are allowed to run without modifications during dark hours, typically only those on clear channels in North America. Many stations have no authorization to run at all outside of daylight hours.

For FM broadcasting (and the few remaining low-band TV stations), weather is the primary cause for changes in VHF propagation, along with some diurnal changes when the sky is mostly without cloud cover. These changes are most obvious during temperature inversions, such as in the late-night and early-morning hours when it is clear, allowing the ground and the air near it to cool more rapidly. This not only causes dew, frost, or fog, but also causes a slight "drag" on the bottom of the radio waves, bending the signals down such that they can follow the Earth's curvature over the normal radio horizon. The result is typically several stations being heard from another media market – usually a neighboring one, but sometimes ones from a few hundred kilometers (miles) away.  Ice storms are also the result of inversions, but these normally cause more scattered omnidirection propagation, resulting mainly in interference, often among weather radio stations. In late spring and early summer, a combination of other atmospheric factors can occasionally cause skips that duct high-power signals to places well over 1000 km (600 miles) away.

Non-broadcast signals are also affected. Mobile phone signals are in the UHF band, ranging from 700 to over 2600 MHz, a range which makes them even more prone to weather-induced propagation changes. In urban (and to some extent suburban) areas with a high population density, this is partly offset by the use of smaller cells, which use lower effective radiated power and beam tilt to reduce interference, and therefore increase frequency reuse and user capacity. However, since this would not be very cost-effective in more rural areas, these cells are larger and so more likely to cause interference over longer distances when propagation conditions allow.

While this is generally transparent to the user thanks to the way that cellular networks handle cell-to-cell handoffs, when cross-border signals are involved, unexpected charges for international roaming may occur despite not having left the country at all. This often occurs between southern San Diego and northern Tijuana at the western end of the U.S./Mexico border, and between eastern Detroit and western  Windsor along the U.S./Canada border. Since signals can travel unobstructed over a body of water far larger than the Detroit River, and cool water temperatures also cause inversions in surface air, this "fringe roaming" sometimes occurs across the Great Lakes, and between islands in the Caribbean. Signals can skip from the Dominican Republic to a mountainside in Puerto Rico and vice versa, or between the U.S. and British Virgin Islands, among others. While unintended cross-border roaming is often automatically removed by mobile phone company billing systems, inter-island roaming is typically not.

Empirical models
A radio propagation model, also known as the radio wave propagation model or the radio frequency propagation model, is an empirical mathematical formulation for the characterization of radio wave propagation as a function of frequency, distance and other conditions. A single model is usually developed to predict the behavior of propagation for all similar links under similar constraints. Created with the goal of formalizing the way radio waves are propagated from one place to another, such models typically predict the path loss along a link or the effective coverage area of a transmitter.

As the path loss encountered along any radio link serves as the dominant factor for characterization of propagation for the link, radio propagation models typically focus on realization of the path loss with the auxiliary task of predicting the area of coverage for a transmitter or modeling the distribution of signals over different regions

Because each individual telecommunication link has to encounter different terrain, path, obstructions, atmospheric conditions and other phenomena, it is intractable to formulate the exact loss for all telecommunication systems in a single mathematical equation. As a result, different models exist for different types of radio links under different conditions. The models rely on computing the median path loss for a link under a certain probability that the considered conditions will occur.

Radio propagation models are empirical in nature, which means, they are developed based on large collections of data collected for the specific scenario. For any model, the collection of data has to be sufficiently large to provide enough likeliness (or enough scope) to all kind of situations that can happen in that specific scenario. Like all empirical models, radio propagation models do not point out the exact behavior of a link, rather, they predict the most likely behavior the link may exhibit under the specified conditions.

Different models have been developed to meet the needs of realizing the propagation behavior in different conditions. Types of models for radio propagation include:

Models for free space attenuation
 Free-space path loss
 Dipole field strength in free space
 Friis transmission equation

Models for outdoor attenuation
Terrain models
ITU terrain model
Egli model
Longley–Rice Irregular Terrain Model (ITM)
Two-ray ground-reflection model
City models
Okumura model
Hata model
COST Hata model

Models for indoor attenuation
ITU model for indoor attenuation
Log-distance path loss model

See also

 Anomalous propagation
 Channel model
 Computation of radiowave attenuation in the atmosphere
 Critical frequency
 Diversity scheme
 Earth bulge
 Effective Earth radius
 Earth-ionosphere waveguide
 Electromagnetic radiation
 F2 propagation
 Fading
 Free space
 Fresnel zone
 Inversion (meteorology)
 Kennelly–Heaviside layer
 Link budget
 Mobility model
 Nakagami fading
 Near and far field
 Propagation Graph
 Radio atmospherics
 Radio frequency
 Radio horizon
 Radio resource management
 Ray tracing (physics)
 Rayleigh fading
 Schumann resonance
 Skip (radio)
 Skip zone
 Skywave
 TV and FM DX
 Traffic generation model
 Tropospheric propagation
 Upfade
 VOACAP - Free professional HF propagation prediction software
 Vertical and horizontal (radio propagation)

Footnotes

References

Further reading

External links

 Solar widget Propagation widget based on NOAA data. Also available as WordPress plugin.
 ARRL Propagation Page The American Radio Relay League page on radio propagation.
 HF Radio and Ionospheric Prediction Service - Australia
 NASA Space Weather Action Center
 Online Propagation Tools, HF Solar Data, and HF Propagation Tutorials
 HF ionospheric propagation several pages